Villaba (IPA: [vɪ'ʎabɐ]), officially the Municipality of Villaba, is a 3rd class municipality in the province of Leyte, Philippines. According to the 2020 census, it has a population of 42,859 people.

History

Pre-Spanish History 
The existence of the place now known as Villaba was discovered in about the last quarter of the sixteenth century by Boholano traders. These traders landed on the western coast and found fertile plains along the river and forest. The sea coast also proved to be good fishing ground. The settlers built their houses along the banks of the river and banded into groups to protect themselves from the moro pirates and wild animals. Along the banks of the river were "Hindang" trees which grew in abundance so they called the new settlement Hamindangon (full of hindang trees).

As the years passed, more settlers migrated from Bohol and Cebu. These new inhabitants likewise settled on the plains along the Hamindangon River.

Spanish Period 
During the expedition of the entire Eastern Visayas by Spanish conquistador in 1593, a group of Spaniards, led by the General-Governor's son, Luis Pérez Dasmariñas landed on the shores of Hamindangon and the named the place Nueva Galicia in honor of his father, the Governor-General of the Philippines, Gomez Perez Dasmariñas who is from Galicia, Spain.

The governor set sail from Cavite for Pintado province in October 1593, to join the part of the fleet under Luis Pérez who is already at the Visayas. Before he proceeded to Moluccas, Luis Pérez introduced the barrio of Nueva Galicia to the whole fleet. But the Governor-General renamed the place to Vilalba (from the Spanish town in Galicia region) in order not to confused with other Nueva Galicia town that is located in Mexico.

Over the years, the natives of the barrio had problem of Spanish unaccented digraphs, mispronouncing Vilalba (Spanish pronunciation: [biˈʎalβa]) with Villaba (IPA: [vɪ'ʎabɐ]), and perhaps, it is easier to pronounce the later name and thus retained it when the town was officially established in June 1910.

American Period 
The Spanish was defeated by the Americans who started their occupation of the Philippines on August 13, 1898. The following year, there was a popular revolt in the Visayas particularly in Samar and Leyte called the Pulahanes movement. One consequence of that revolution against the Americans was that the town of Villaba was reduced to a barrio and became part of the municipality of San Isidro, Leyte.

During that period, Villaba was then ran by local executives known as cabeza de barangay. For want of official records however, to provide a complete list and their specific terms of office, the following have served in the said capacity:

1.   Andres Gervacio

2.   Antonio Dejillo

3.   Fortunato Cabilar

4.   Hermogenes Tumamak

5.   Casimiro Tumamak

7.   Tomas Tumamak

8.   Luciano Domael

In June 1910, the Provincial Board of Leyte passed and approved a resolution creating the Municipality of Villaba. Since then, there was a continuous change of Chief Executives in the municipality up to the present.

1.   Juan Burgos - 1910 to 1912

2.   Flaviano Domael - 1913 to 1915

3.   Carmelino Rubillos - 1916 to 1918

4.   Flaviano Domael - 1919 to 1921

5.   Paulino Dejillo - 1922 to 1924

6.   Flaviano Domael - 1925 to 1927

7.   Damian Perez  - 1928 to 1930

8.   Bartolome Esmas - 1931 to 1939

9.   Vicente Veloso - 1940 to 1945

10. Eusebio Gaviola - 1945 to 1946

11. Fermin Tumamak - 1946 to 1950

12. Francisco Burgos - 1951 to 1959

13. Alberto Veloso - 1960 to 1963

14. Bartolome Esmas - Oct 1963 to Dec 1963

15. Sofronio Ramirez - 1964 to 1967

16. Aurelio Veloso  -  1968 to Apr 1980

17. Antonio Villamor - May 1980 to Apr 20,1986

18. Faustino Tumamak - (OIC) Apr 21, 1986

19. Roman Omega  - (OIC) Dec 4, 1987 - Feb 1988

20. Faustino Tumamak, Jr. - Feb 1988 to Mar 1992

21. Leonora Rosal - Mar 1992 to Jun 1992

22. Jorge V. Veloso - Jul 1,1992 to 1998

23. Atty. Faustino Tumamak Jr.- 1998 to 2004

24. Claudio Martin Larrazabal - 2004 to 2013

25. Jorge V. Veloso - 2013 to 2016

26. Juliet A. Larrazabal - 2016 to 2019

27. Jorge V. Veloso - 2019 to June 2022

28. Carlos G. Veloso - July 2022 to present

Barangays

Villaba is politically subdivided into 35 barangays.

Climate

Demographics

Economy

References

External links
 [ Philippine Standard Geographic Code]
Philippine Census Information
Local Governance Performance Management System

Municipalities of Leyte (province)